Agoro is a surname. Notable people with the surname include:

Afeez Agoro (born 1975), Nigerian model, actor, and reality television personality
Mo Agoro (born 1993), English-born rugby league player
Zaina Agoro, Nigerian American singer-songwriter